Mindshadow is a science fiction novel by American writer J.M. Dillard, part of theStar Trek: The Original Series franchise. It was the first novel written by Dillard, and featured the debut of Lt. Ingrid Tomson who went on to appear in several further Star Trek works.

Plot
The peaceful planet of Aritani becomes the center of a Romulan plot to gain power. A Romulan double agent and a severely injured Spock further complicate the situation.

Production
Before she wrote any Star Trek novels, Dillard described herself as a secret fan of the series and would smuggle the books into her home so that her husband didn't know that she read them. At the time she was an English lecturer at the American University in Washington D.C., and decided to give writing a try after she was fired from the University for attempting to organise a trade union. This gave her the time to develop the novel Mindshadow, which was her first attempt at writing any novel. She used Writer's Market to ensure that she followed the correct format, and sent it into Pocket Books without showing it to anyone else.

After a year, she hadn't received a response and so chased the editor of Pocket Books for progress, only to find that they had lost her draft. So Dillard set about re-writing it, but before she finished the new version, she was contacted by the publishers as they had found her original version and wanted to publish it. One of the characters in the novel was based on her experiences with the University, after it hired her back and sacked the person who had fired her. In the novel, Lt. Ingrid Tomson was based on that person, who Dillard described as "super-competent, anal-retentive, really uptight". The character would go on to appear in other Star Trek books by Dillard as well as those by other authors such as Time for Yesterday by Ann Crispin.

References

External links

Novels based on Star Trek: The Original Series
1986 American novels
American science fiction novels